Tomorrow Lies in Ambush is a collection of science fiction short stories by Bob Shaw, published in 1973. It contains :

 "Call me Dumbo"
 "Stormseeker"
 "Repeat Performance"
 "... And Isles where Good Men Lie"
 "What Time do you Call This?"
 "Communication"
 "The Cosmic Cocktail Party"
 "The Happiest Day of Your Life"
 "The Weapons of Isher II"
 "Pilot Plant"
 "Telemart Three"
 "Invasion of Privacy"

1973 short story collections
Short story collections by Bob Shaw
Ace Books books